Unnatural History is an original novel written by Jonathan Blum and Kate Orman and based on the long-running British science fiction television series Doctor Who. It features the Eighth Doctor, Sam, Fitz and Faction Paradox.

Plot
In London during the year 2002, the dark-haired Sam Jones is living a normal life, though struggling with a drug addiction, when the Eighth Doctor arrives in the shop she works in and tells her that she should have blonde hair and be travelling with him. Shocked by this, she runs out onto the street to get away from him and is attacked by a ten-year-old boy, who claims that she shouldn't exist. When the Doctor rescues her, she agrees to go with him to San Francisco. When they arrive, the Doctor finds Fitz and explains that when the TARDIS destroyed the Earth, but reversed time, a scar in space and time was left behind and strange creatures from other dimensions are being attracted to the city by it. The TARDIS has become trapped inside the scar, and will be crushed by the strain of trying to stabilise the scar in three days unless it is removed. When the Doctor originally arrived, blonde Sam fell in the scar, and dark Sam appeared in London.

The Doctor's attempts to contact the Time Lords to obtain new equipment to close the scar fails, and he meets the boy again, who reveals that he is a member of Faction Paradox, but he claims that he isn't here to harm the Doctor, just to observe his actions. Later the Doctor notices a Kraken in the bay, which will destroy the city looking for food if it detects the energy coming from the scar, but the TARDIS is currently blocking it from detecting them. Now under another time limit, the Doctor finds a scientist called Joyce who promises to help repair the equipment needed to close the scar. The Doctor tells Sam that her biodata is vulnerable to change from the pulses coming from the scar.

One of Fitz's contacts kidnaps them and delivers them to a man who fits them with tracking devices and releases them. In Golden Gate Park the Doctor discovers lines of his own biodata lying exposed on the ground, and seeing this removes the tracking devices. The Doctor now realizes that the man who kidnapped them was from the higher dimensions, and has been experimenting with the Doctor's biodata. The Doctor learns that the man's name is Griffin and he wants to collect the unnatural creatures in the city. The Doctor traps Griffin who explains that his ambition is to categorize every creature in the universe. Griffin then escapes and the Doctor returns to his hotel. At the hotel Griffin's henchmen kidnap Fitz, but accidentally leave Sam behind.

The Doctor goes to check Joyce's progress with his equipment, only to discover that Joyce has also been experimenting with his biodata as well, but refuses to explain why. After learning that Fitz has been kidnapped, the Doctor confronts Griffin, who explains that he wants to see the Kraken destroy the city. Griffin decides to simplify the Doctor's biodata and begins experimenting on it. Sam attempts to rescue him, but Griffin takes a sample of her biodata before they both escape. Joyce finishes repairing the Doctor's equipment. Returning to the scar, the Doctor finds his equipment can't close the scar and will only remove the TARDIS from the scar, which will enable the Kraken to destroy the city, so the Doctor decides to sacrifice the TARDIS to seal the scar.

Joyce accidentally tells Griffin that the largest amount of the Doctor's exposed biodata is at the scar. Griffin goes there and tries to edit the Doctor and Sam's biodata, but the Doctor threatens to alter the higher dimensions that Griffin lives in. Griffin releases Fitz, but Fitz then attacks Griffin and traps him in his dimensionally transcendental specimen box. The Doctor pulls the TARDIS out of the scar, causing the Kraken to look for food. The Doctor places a machine to distract the Kraken on the bay, and the boy offers to create a paradox, but the Doctor refuses. Back at the scar, Sam jumps in, turning her into blonde Sam.  The Doctor frees Griffin's specimens from the box, who attack Griffin and push him into the scar. Sam throws the specimen box into the scar after him, causing it to close, and which causes dark Sam to cease to exist and the Kraken and the other creatures return to their own dimension.

The boy explains that blonde Sam is a paradox, because blonde Sam was created when dark Sam threw herself in amongst the Doctor’s biodata in the scar, but she was only able to do so because the Doctor brought her to the scar he’d created. Now he has no shadow, like the other Faction members, and the boy tells him that he will soon be a Faction member.

Continuity
Whilst mocking the Doctor, the boy from Faction Paradox mentions that the Doctor could be an exile from the 49th century, a reference to the original, un-broadcast version of An Unearthly Child.
The Doctor's inability to see the colour violet saves his life in the later novel To the Slaughter.
This novel ends the Dark Sam plot arc. She was first seen in Alien Bodies, and briefly mentioned in Seeing I and The Taint.
It is implied that Professor Daniel Joyce is the Doctor's father. His name is a reference to various un-made Doctor Who scripts that gave the Doctor's father's name as Ulysses and the book of the same name's author, James Joyce. In the final Eighth Doctor book The Gallifrey Chronicles, a flashback shows a Time Lord character called Ulysses also working with someone called Larna and a human called Penelope who might be the Doctor's human mother.
Joyce's assistant Larna, may be the same Larna from The Infinity Doctors as several other plot points from The Infinity Doctors are mentioned briefly in the book.

External links
The Cloister Library - Unnatural History

Reviews
The Whoniverse's review on Unnatural History

1999 British novels
1999 science fiction novels
Eighth Doctor Adventures
Novels by Kate Orman
Novels by Jonathan Blum
Faction Paradox